Narreddy Tulasi Reddy is an Indian politician. He is Chairman of 20 Point Program Committee. Assumed office 2020 APCC Working president He belongs to Indian National Congress.

References

1951 births
Living people
People from Kadapa district
Indian National Congress politicians from Andhra Pradesh